Adaílson Pereira Coelho, more commonly known as Abuda (born 28 March 1986 in São Luís), is a Brazilian striker.

In January 2009, he was loaned to Paraná, in February 2009 to Marília and in May of the same year to Brasiliense.

Honours
 World Cup (U 17): 2003
 São Paulo's Cup (U 20): 2004

References

External links 

 Abuda at globoesporte.globo.com 

1986 births
Living people
People from São Luís, Maranhão
Brazilian footballers
Brazilian expatriate footballers
Association football forwards
Sport Club Corinthians Paulista players
Clube Náutico Capibaribe players
Bundesliga players
VfL Wolfsburg players
Beerschot A.C. players
CR Vasco da Gama players
Oeste Futebol Clube players
FC Gifu players
Tokyo Verdy players
J2 League players
Expatriate footballers in Germany
Expatriate footballers in Belgium
Expatriate footballers in France
Expatriate footballers in Japan
Sportspeople from Maranhão